Golghar Museum is a museum in Bhopal, India. 
It showcases a variety of arts, handicraft and social life from the Nawab-era. The museum was inaugurated in April 2013 by Culture Minister Laxmikant Sharma. The major collections here denote the cultural and political history of the Princely State of Bhopal.

References 

Museums in Bhopal
Museums established in 2013
2013 establishments in Madhya Pradesh